The United States Virgin Islands made its Paralympic Games début at the 2012 Summer Paralympics in London, sending a single athlete to compete in two para-equestrian events.

The Virgin Islands has never taken part in the Winter Paralympic Games, and no Virgin Islander athlete has ever won a Paralympic medal.

Full results for Virgin Islands at the Paralympics

See also
 Virgin Islands at the Olympics
 Virgin Islands at the Pan American Games

References